These are the things named after Jean-Pierre Serre, a French mathematician.
Bass–Serre theory
Serre class
Quillen–Suslin theorem (sometimes known as "Serre's Conjecture" or "Serre's problem")
Serre's Conjecture concerning Galois representations
Serre's "Conjecture II" concerning linear algebraic groups
Serre's criterion (there are several of them.)
Serre duality
Serre–Grothendieck–Verdier duality
Serre's FAC
Serre fibration
Serre's C-theory
Serre's inequality on height
Serre group
Serre's modularity conjecture
Serre's multiplicity conjectures
Serre's open image theorem
Serre's property FA
Serre relations
Serre subcategory
Serre functor
Serre spectral sequence
Lyndon–Hochschild–Serre spectral sequence
Serre–Swan theorem
Serre–Tate theorem
Serre's theorem in group cohomology
Serre's theorem on affineness
Serre twist sheaf
Serre's vanishing theorem
Thin set in the sense of Serre

See also
Serre conjecture (disambiguation)

Notes 

Serre